Camp Blood is a series of American direct-to-video slasher films.

Films

References 

American slasher films
American independent films
American LGBT-related films
Direct-to-video horror films
Films shot in Los Angeles
LGBT-related horror films
American serial killer films
Horror films about clowns
 
American comedy horror films
Films shot in Pennsylvania